The 2022–23 Latvian–Estonian Basketball League, known as Paf Latvian–Estonian Basketball League for sponsorship reasons, is the 5th season of the Latvian–Estonian Basketball League, the combined top basketball division of Latvia and Estonia. This season the league is also joined by Ukrainian team BC Prometey.

Competition format  
The regular season consists of two rounds, followed by the quarter-finals and Final 4.

Teams  
After Russia's invasion in Ukraine teams from Ukrainian Superleague started to look for opportunities to join leagues abroad. On June 17, 2022 it was announced that one of the most elite Ukrainian teams BC Prometey will join Latvian-Estonian Basketball League for the 2022–23 season. It will play its home games in Riga. 

On July 21, 2022 Keila KK joined the league after winning bronze in Estonian 1. Liiga the previous season.  

16 teams will be the highest number of teams participating in the League since its establishment.

List of teams

Personnel and kits

Regular season

League table

Results

Play-offs 
On March 9, 2023, it was announced that the Final Four tournament this season will take place in Estonian capital Tallinn on 7 and 8 April.

Quarterfinals 

|}

Statistics 
As of March 19, 2023.

Points

Rebounds

Assists

Awards

MVP of the Month

Estonian and Latvian clubs in European competitions

References

External links
Official website
Estonian Basketball Association 
Latvian Basketball Association 

Latvia-Estonia
Latvian–Estonian Basketball League
2022–23 in Estonian basketball
2022–23 in Latvian basketball
Latv